Patriarch Theophilus of Jerusalem may refer to:

 Theophilus I of Jerusalem (ruled in 1012–1020)
 Theophilus II of Jerusalem (ruled 1417–1424), Greek Orthodox Patriarch of Jerusalem
 Patriarch Theophilos III of Jerusalem, ruled since 2005